Phaeotrema is a genus of lichenized fungi in the family Thelotremataceae; according to the 2007 Outline of Ascomycota, the placement in this family is uncertain.

References

Ostropales
Lichen genera
Ostropales genera
Taxa named by Johannes Müller Argoviensis